Title 25 of the United States Code outlines the role of Indians in the United States Code.

  – Bureau of Indian Affairs
  – Officers of Indian Affairs
  – Indian Claims Commission
  – Agreements With Indians
  – Performance by United States of Obligations to Indians
  – Protection of Indians
  – Government of Indian Country and Reservations
  – Education of Indians
  – Promotion of Social and Economic Welfare
  – Rights-Of-Way Through Indian Lands
  – Allotment of Indian Lands
  – Descent and Distribution; Heirs of Allottee
  – Irrigation of Allotted Lands
  – Lease, Sale, or Surrender of Allotted or Unallotted Lands
  – Ceded Indian Lands
  – Miscellaneous
  – Constitutional Rights of Indians
  – Distribution of Judgment Funds
  – Financing Economic Development of Indians and Indian Organizations
  – Indian Health Care
  – Indian Land Claims Settlements
  – Tribally Controlled College or University Assistance
  – Indian Child Welfare
  – Bureau of Indian Affairs Programs
  – Development of Tribal Mineral Resources
  – Indian Land Consolidation
  – Old Age Assistance Claims Settlement
  – Indian Alcohol and Substance Abuse Prevention and Treatment
  – Tribally Controlled School Grants
  – Indian Education Program
  – Indian Gaming Regulation
  – Indian Law Enforcement Reform
  – Native American Languages
  – Native American Graves Protection and Repatriation
  – National Indian Forest Resources Management
  – Indian Child Protection and Family Violence Prevention
  – Indian Higher Education Programs
  – Indian Employment, Training and Related Services
  – Indian Energy Resources
  – Indian Tribal Justice Support
  – Indian Tribal Justice Technical and Legal Assistance
  – American Indian Agricultural Resource Management
  – Indian Dams Safety
  – Indian Lands Open Dump Cleanup
  – American Indian Trust Fund Management Reform
  – Native American Housing Assistance and Self-Determination
  – Native American Business Development, Trade Promotion, and Tourism

External links
U.S. Code Title 25, via United States Government Printing Office
U.S. Code Title 25, via Cornell University

25
Title 25